Pascal Aubier is a French actor, director, script writer, producer and editor, born in 1943 in Paris, France.

Filmography

As actor 
 1958 : Faibles femmes
 1964 : Lucky Jo
 1965 : Pierrot le fou : Brother #2
 1966 : Chappaqua
 1967 : Mamaia : Manager
 1968 : La Fille d'en face : Georges
 1969 : Sirocco d'hiver (Sirokkó) : Tihomir
 1969 : L'Examen du petit
 1969 : La Bande à Bonnot : Eugène Dieudonné
 1971 : Valparaiso, Valparaiso
 1972 : Le Soldat et les trois sœurs
 1979 : Rien ne va plus : Hospital patient, Métro passenger, Jean-Gabriel
 1980 : Bobo la tête : The officer
 1980 : Ma blonde, entends-tu dans la ville ? : Syndicaliste
 1981 : Le Rat
 1982 : Tokyo no yami (aka Laissé inachevé à Tokyo)
 1982 : Rock (TV) : Impresario Guzzi Smith
 1983 : Debout les crabes, la mer monte !, dir. Jean-Jacques Grand-Jouan : Le maton
 1984 : Les Favoris de la lune : Monsieur Laplace
 1986 : Hôtel du paradis : Jefe de camareros
 1986 : Les Petits coins
 1988 : La Trajectoire amoureuse
 1988 : Hemingway (TV miniseries)
 1989 : Mona et moi
 1990 : Le Bal du gouverneur : Lighthouse keeper
 1991 : Le Cri des hommes : Commissaire Péron
 1991 : Sushi Sushi : Schlumpelmeyer
 1992 : La Chasse aux papillons
 1994 : La Mort de Molière (video) : Chapelle
 1995 : Les Femmes et les enfants d'abord (TV) : Max Theniez
 2000 : Amnesia : French Suitor
 2002 : Lundi matin : A Cossack
 2006 : Un jardin d'automne : Alphonse

Note: Pascal Aubier in his official website, adds, humorously, the following titles: 1925: Battleship Potemkin by Sergei Eisenstein (baby in the pram); 1939: Gone with the Wind by Victor Fleming

As director 
 1965 : Tenebrae factae sunt
 1968 : Monsieur Jean-Claude Vaucherin
 1969 : Le Voyage de Monsieur Guitton
 1969 : Arthur, Arthur
 1971 : Valparaiso, Valparaiso
 1972 : Le Soldat et les trois sœurs
 1974 : Le Puzzle
 1974 : Le Dormeur
 1974 : La Champignonne
 1973 : La Mort du rat
 1975 : Le Chant du départ
 1986 : L'Apparition
 1986 : Les Petits coins
 1987 : La Sauteuse
 1986 : La Cendre
 1985 : Flash back
 1988 : La Trajectoire amoureuse
 1991 : Alice et les Abysses
 1995 : Le Fils de Gascogne
 1999 : Lipstick
 2000 : Come On
 2007 : La Ballade du transsibérien et de la petite Sophie de France

As writer 
 1965 : Tenebrae factae sunt
 1968 : Monsieur Jean-Claude Vaucherin
 1969 : Arthur, Arthur
 1971 : Valparaiso, Valparaiso
 1975 : La Mort du rat
 1986 : L'Apparition
 1986 : Les Petits coins
 1987 : La Sauteuse
 1988 : La Trajectoire amoureuse

As producer 
 1973 : L'Agression
 1968 : Marie et le Curé de Diourka Medveczky
 1969 : L'Espace vital de Patrice Leconte (short)
 1969 : Dossier Penarrroya, les deux visages du trust de Dominique Dubosc (short)
 2000 : Come On

As editor 
 1968 : Monsieur Jean-Claude Vaucherin

Awards and nominations

Awards

Nominations 
 Prix Jean Vigo 1973

See also
 1958 in film

References

External links 
 
 Official site

French male film actors
French film directors
French male screenwriters
French screenwriters
French film producers
French editors
1943 births
Living people
French male television actors
French male non-fiction writers